My Romance is the 14th studio album by American singer-songwriter Carly Simon, released by Arista Records, on March 13, 1990.

The album is Simon's second devoted to standards, following Torch from nine years earlier. It peaked at No. 46 on the Billboard 200, and remained on the chart for 17 weeks. Simon's version of "In the Wee Small Hours of the Morning" from this album was featured in the hit 1993 film Sleepless in Seattle, and was included on the film's soundtrack album.

Reception

In a retrospective review for AllMusic, William Ruhlmann rated the album 3 out of 5 stars, and wrote "On her second album of pop standards, Carly Simon was a little less interested in the lovelorn songs that had filled 1981's Torch. For the most part, the theme was romantic, with classics like "My Funny Valentine" and "Bewitched" handled in Simon's sexy, plaintive style."

Track listing
Credits adapted from the album's liner notes.

Carly in Concert: My Romance

Carly in Concert: My Romance is a 1990 concert special for HBO, featuring Simon and guest star Harry Connick, Jr. It was released on VHS and LaserDisc later the same year. Connick, Jr. participates on piano and bass, as well as vocals. The special was directed by Kathy Daugherty, and runs 73 minutes.

This was Simon's second concert special for HBO, following Live from Martha's Vineyard from 1987.

Track listing
 "Little Girl Blue" (R. Rodgers/L. Hart)
 "By Myself / I See Your Face Before Me" (H. Dietz/A. Schwartz)
 "Bewitched" (R. Rodgers/L. Hart)
 "Something Wonderful" (R. Rodgers/O. Hammerstein)
 "In The Wee Small Hours Of The Morning" (B. Hilliard/D. Mann)
 "New Kind of Love"
 "Stomping at the Savoy"
 "I'm Falling"
 "I Don't Know Why"
 "I Have Dreamed" (Richard Rodgers, Oscar Hammerstein II)
 "We Have No Secrets"
 "When Your Lover Has Gone" (Einar A. Swan)
 "He Was Too Good to Me"
 "What Has She Got" (C. Simon/M. Kosarin/J. Brackman)
 "Time After Time" (J. Styne/S. Cahn)
 "My Romance" (R. Rodgers/L. Hart)

Personnel

Musicians

Production

Charts
Album – Billboard (United States)

References

External links
Carly Simon's Official Website

1990 albums
Arista Records albums
Carly Simon albums
Albums conducted by Marty Paich
Albums arranged by Marty Paich
Albums produced by Frank Filipetti
Traditional pop albums